Kamōš-nadab (Moabite: , romanized as:   or) was the king of Moab during the reign of Sennacherib. He is described on Sennacherib's Prism as bringing tribute to the Assyrian king during the latter's Levantine campaigns.

References

Sources

 
 
 
 

Moab